Amsterdam Muiderpoort is a railway station in the east of Amsterdam. It was reopened on 15 October 1939 after being first opened in 1896. It is located 4 km southeast of Amsterdam Centraal. At this station the Amsterdam–Arnhem railway and the Amsterdam–Zutphen railway split, with the two parts of the station separated (keilbahnhof). The western part is the Amsterdam Centraal to Utrecht Centraal line. The eastern part is the Amsterdam Centraal to Amersfoort Centraal line. The station is operated by the Nederlandse Spoorwegen.

Train services
, the following train services call at this station:
2x per hour local service (Sprinter) The Hague - Leiden - Schiphol - Amsterdam - Weesp - Almere - Lelystad - Zwolle
2x per hour local service (Sprinter) Uitgeest - Amsterdam - Breukelen - Woerden - Rotterdam
2x per hour local service (Sprinter) Hoofddorp - Schiphol - Amsterdam - Hilversum - Amersfoort Vathorst
2x per hour local service (Sprinter) Amsterdam - Breukelen - Utrecht - Rhenen

Tram services
These services are operated by GVB.

1 Muiderpoortstation - Vijzelgracht - Leidseplein - Osdorp de Aker
3 Zoutkeetsgracht - Vondelpark - De Pijp - Museumplein - Muiderpoort
7 Slotermeer - Bos en Lommer - Oud West -  Leidseplein - Weteringschans - Muiderpoort - Flevopark

Bus services
These services are operated by GVB.

22 Spaarndammerbuurt - Central Station - Oosterdok - Zeeburg - Indische Buurt - Muiderpoort
37 Station Amstel - Muiderpoort - Flevopark - Zuiderzeeweg - Nieuwendam - Buiksloot - Noord metro station
40 Station Amstel - Watergraafsmeer - Science Park - Muiderpoort
41 Muiderpoort - Watergraafsmeer - Duivendrecht - Bijlmermeer - Gaasperplas

Gallery

External links

NS website 
Dutch Public Transport journey planner 

Muiderpoort
Railway stations opened in 1896
Railway stations opened in 1939
Railway stations on the Rhijnspoorweg
Tram stops in Amsterdam
Amsterdam-Oost